Terry Mulvoy (December 2, 1938 – September 28, 2020) was an English footballer who played as a forward.

Career  
Mulvoy played in the Football League Third Division in 1957 with Rochdale A.F.C. He made two appearances for Rochdale throughout the season. In 1961, he played abroad in Canada's National Soccer League with Toronto Ulster United. He would play an additional season with Toronto in 1962. After the conclusion of the 1961 NSL season, he played the remainder of the year in the United States with New York Ukrainians.

In 1963, he returned to play in the German-American Soccer League with New York Ukrainians. In 1966, he returned to the United States to play in the regional California circuits originally with Orange County Soccer Club in the Continental Soccer League. In his debut season with Orange County, he played in a friendly match against FC Bayern Munich. He signed with Lynwood Falcons the following season and was named to the league All-Star team. When Lynwood joined the Greater Los Angeles Soccer League in 1968 he re-signed with the club.

In 1969, he signed with league rivals St. Stephen A.C. and was named the team captain. He played with Scandia Soccer Club for the 1973 season. The following season he played his final season with former club St. Stephen.

He died on September 28, 2020 in Long Beach, California.

References  

1938 births
2020 deaths
Association football forwards
English footballers
Rochdale A.F.C. players
Toronto Ulster United players
English Football League players
Canadian National Soccer League players
German-American Soccer League players
Footballers from Manchester